Defenders of the Earth is an American animated television series produced in 1986, featuring characters from three comic strips distributed by King Features Syndicate—Flash Gordon, The Phantom, Mandrake the Magician, and Mandrake's assistant Lothar—opposing Ming the Merciless in the year 2015. Supporting characters include their children Rick Gordon (son of Flash), L.J. (son of Lothar), Kshin (adopted son of Mandrake), and Jedda Walker (daughter of the Phantom).

The show lasted for 65 episodes; there was also a short-lived comic book series published by Star Comics (an imprint of Marvel Comics). The closing credits credit Rob Walsh and Tony Pastor for the main title music, and Stan Lee for the lyrics. The series was later shown in reruns on the Sci Fi Channel as part of Sci Fi's animation block, Cartoon Quest.

Flash Gordon has also been seen in two other animated series: The New Adventures of Flash Gordon (1979–82), and Flash Gordon (1996–97).

Premise 
Flash Gordon and his son Rick escape from Ming the Merciless, who has exhausted the natural resources of his home planet Mongo and desires to exploit Earth. Ming tries to brainwash Flash's wife Dale Arden, but she resists until death, whereafter her psyche is later included in the Defenders' supercomputer Dynac X. To protect Earth from Ming's invasion, among other threats, Flash joins forces with Mandrake, his assistant Lothar and The Phantom, alongside their children, to form the Defenders.

Characters

Protagonists 

 Flash Gordon (voiced by Lou Richards) — Leader of the Defenders of the Earth: a space pilot and the father of Rick Gordon.
 The Phantom (voiced by Peter Mark Richman) — Essentially identical to Lee Falk's character, but differing from the original in that by chanting "By jungle law, the Ghost Who Walks calls forth the power of ten tigers", he momentarily receives superhuman strength. His real name is Kit Walker. His horse Hero and wolf Devil make brief appearances. The end credits describe this Phantom by saying "This is the 27th Phantom".
 Mandrake the Magician (voiced by Peter Renaday) — A hypnotist and mystic capable of manipulating others' perceptions almost at will. He is often portrayed as a secondary leader of the Defenders, and sometimes the narrator of their decisions.
 Lothar (voiced by Buster Jones) — Mandrake's assistant and bodyguard, depicted as a powerful fighter, an able mechanic, and a master tactician. The action figure's packaging describes Lothar as a "Caribbean ninja".
 Richard "Rick" Gordon (voiced by Loren Lester) — Richard is an impulsive computer genius and the son of Flash Gordon. Rick, along with many of the other teenagers of the show, attended Central High located in Central City. Rick Gordon was initially intended to be Kit Walker, the son of the Phantom.
 L.J. (voiced by Dion Williams) — Short for 'Lothar Jr.', L.J. is the street-wise martial arts expert son of Lothar, and Rick's best friend. When in one episode, the Defenders locate a crystal which shows them their greatest desires, L.J.'s is to defeat the antagonist Octon.
 Jedda Walker (voiced by Sarah Partridge) — Jedda is the daughter of the Phantom and displays telepathy and limited extrasensory powers, usually expressed by communication with her black panther Kisa. There is little-or-no mention of her mother, though in one episode she is the reluctant stepdaughter of Queen Hadea. Some installments imply a relationship with Rick Gordon. Jedda Walker was initially intended to be Jedda Gordon, daughter of Flash Gordon.
 Kshin (voiced by Adam Carl) — Kshin is an orphaned boy adopted by Mandrake and trained as his apprentice. His origins are revealed in the late season episode "The adoption of Kshin", where it is shown he was a young street orphan found by Mandrake after a gang of boys tried using him as a distraction in a failed pick-pocketing attempt. He is usually accompanied by the extraterrestrial "Zuffy", initially found by Rick Gordon on the planet Mongo.
 Dynac X (voiced by Diane Pershing) — Dynac X is the central computer of the Defenders' Headquarters, whose operating system is stated to contain the psyche of Flash Gordon's wife. Though she is never addressed by name in the series, the comic book adaptation of the first two episodes identifies the slain "Mrs. Gordon" as Dale Arden. Diane Pershing is the only performer from the Filmation cartoon who reprised her role.

Antagonists 
 Ming the Merciless (voiced by Ron Feinberg) — A warlord or supervillain bent on exploiting Earth's natural resources, based on 'Ice Station Earth'. This version is made more grotesque than his traditional appearance to avoid racial stereotyping; a similar treatment would be used on the Mandarin in the Iron Man animated series and on Dr. No in James Bond Jr., in that all three characters received green skin and pointed ears.
 Prince Kro-Tan (voiced by Hal Rayle) — Ming the Merciless' son
 Princess Castra (voiced by Jennifer Darling) — Ming the Merciless' daughter
 Octon (voiced by William Callaway) — an octopus-like artificial intelligence, equivalent to an 'evil version' of Dynac X, which advises Ming the Merciless of methods to conquer the Earth or defeat the Defenders. His name is derived from that of an opponent of Mandrake's in the latter's eponymous comic strip, wherein it identifies a crime lord also known as the Cobra.
 Garax (voiced by William Callaway) — the leader of Ming's mechanical soldiers, the Ice Robots. He is the only one of these to recur, and the only one given any distinction from the others, who are frequently slain en masse by the Defenders.
 Mongor — a giant serpent-like pet of Ming the Merciless
 Kurt Walker (voiced by William Callaway) — Aliased "N'Dama the Weather Demon", Kurt is the older brother of the Phantom. When competing in a trial with Kit for the right to become the next Phantom, Kurt won but was passed-over in favor of Kit due his father knowing that he had lied and cheated, as well as abandoning his brother after causing a rock fall that had injured him.  This results in him being disinherited by their father, and the contempt he has for Kit. Kurt is specifically created for the series and has never appeared elsewhere.
 The Sky Band — A coalition of raiders depicted in the Phantom comics; here depicted as space-pirates.
 Queen Hadea — ruler of the subterranean 'Netherworld', where she is the latest in a dynasty of monarchs served by pale, deformed humanoids. In her first appearance, Hadea desires to take the Phantom as a consort. After later offering to heal the injured Jedda Walker, she displays a brief interest in assuming a maternal role in the girl's life. Her great ambition is to capture the powerful 'Necklace of Oros', which confers control of others in the user's presence.
 Graviton — the original owner of the Necklace of Oros, and implied to have dwelt among the Moai of Rapa Nui, Graviton is an extradimensional being of unknown origins, who seeks to recover the Necklace from Earth and establish himself as a dictator.

Production 
Marvel Productions and King Features Syndicate worked together to develop the show. Marvel Productions had brought in consulting company Q5 Corporation to help develop the show. Q5's consultants consist of psychology PhDs and advertising, marketing and research professionals. The animation for the series were done overseas at Daewon Media and Sei Young Animation (now merged with Dong Woo Animation) and AKOM in Seoul, South Korea, and Toei Animation in Tokyo, Japan.

Episodes

Home releases 
In 1987, select episodes of the show were released on four VHS cassettes by Family Home Entertainment in North America.

Roughly two decades after production was completed, the series was released around the world on DVD, featuring various episodes and packaging depending on region.

United States 
On October 10, 2006 and April 3, 2007 the series were released to DVD by BCI Eclipse Entertainment LLC (under its Ink & Paint classic animation entertainment label) in Region 1, containing all 65 original broadcast episodes in two Complete Series volumes and presented in original storyline continuity order.

These release includes interviews with story editor Bryce Malek, writer David Wise, and artist Michael Swanigan—each of whom reflect on various points of the creative process, including the origins of the characters, legal issues surrounding the properties, controversial content, and ways in which the production differed from others of its time.

Mill Creek Entertainment re-released the complete series on DVD in Region 1 on May 18, 2010.

The series is streaming on Amazon Prime Video and Tubi TV.

Germany 
NEW KSM FILM has released the series in Germany:
 Defenders of the Earth (Gesamtedition) (1-Blu-ray) – only German language – no extras
 Defenders of the Earth (Superbox) (4-disc set DVDs) – only German language – no extras
 Defenders of the Earth (Volume One) (6-disc set DVDs) – only German language – earlier release, no extras
 Defenders of the Earth (Volume Two) (6-disc set DVDS) – only German language – earlier release, no extras

Australia 
Force Entertainment has released the series in Australia:
 Defenders of the Earth (6-disc set)
 Defenders of the Earth (8-disc set), disc 7 features the film "The Story Begins" and disc 8 the film "Prince Kro-Tan".

The first episode appears on the BCI Eclipse DVD releases for:
 Animated All-Stars collection
 The New Adventures of Flash Gordon: The Complete Series

BCI has also released two 5-Disc sets that cover the entire series:
 Defenders of the Earth—Complete Series Volume 1 (5-Discs) 33 Episodes
 Defenders of the Earth—Complete Series Volume 2 (5-Discs) 32 Episodes (April 3, 2007)' U.K. 
Selected episodes are available in the UK, in compilations including: 
Hollywood DVD LTD
 Defenders of the Earth—The Story BeginsDelta Music PLC
 Defenders of the Earth vol 1
 Defenders of the Earth vol 2
 Defenders of the Earth vol 3
 The above volumes include three episodes each, covering the first eight episodes of the series and the series finale, "Ming's Thunder Lizards".
 Defenders of the Earth Movie — "The Book of Mysteries"
 "The Book of Mysteries" combines episodes 31–35
 Defenders of the Earth Movie — "Prince Kro-Tan"
 "Prince of Kro-Tan" combines episodes 46–50
 Defenders of the Earth Movie — "Necklace of Oros"
 "Necklace of Oros" combines episodes 56–60
The complete series was then released in the UK by Fabulous Films and Fremantle Media on February 18, 2013.

 Sweden 
VHS-Select Video (7104/73)
Ondskans Makt (1987) 
incl episodes - Ondskans Makt (?), Bröder (?), Dynak i Fara (?) - Only Swedish voice

 In other media 
 Comics 
In 1987, Star Comics (Marvel Comics' children's imprint) published a comic book series which only lasted four issues. It was written by Stan Lee (#1) and Michael Higgins (#2–4) with art by Alex Saviuk. The last issue featured a "next issue" caption, but #5 was never published.

In 2013, Dynamite Comics published Kings Watch, a bi-monthly limited series written by Jeff Parker teaming the Phantom, Mandrake, Lothar, and Flash Gordon, taking on not just Ming, but characters from all over the King Features universe. The comic lasted five issues.

 Books 
There have been DOE-related books, including The Creation of Monitor, A House Divided, The Sun-Stealers and Computer Checkmate.

 Action figures 
A line of action figures produced by Galoob included Flash Gordon, Mandrake, Lothar, the Phantom, Ming, and Garax. As part of the show's 35th anniversary, National Entertainment Collectibles Association (NECA) produced variants of its King Features characters in the style and colors of the Defenders of the Earth.

 Video games 
A video game was released by Enigma Variations Software in 1990, for the Amiga, Atari ST, Commodore 64, Amstrad CPC, SAM Coupe and ZX Spectrum systems. It was a side-scrolling action game featuring the heroes Flash Gordon, Lothar, the Phantom and Mandrake from the series on a quest to rescue their children who have been kidnapped by Ming. The player controls Flash, and is able to call on the other characters to assist him in bypassing the defences of Ming's castle.

 Parodies 
 A parody, called Protectors of the Earth, is made up of comic strip characters Dr. Rex Morgan, Mary Worth, Garfield and Mark Trail.
 Robot Chicken'' produced a sketch where Flash Gordon, Mandrake and the Phantom operated as part of a Neighborhood Watch.

References

External links 
 Don Markstein's Toonopedia: Defenders of the Earth, defenders
 
 
 Official Episode guide

1986 American television series debuts
1987 American television series endings
1980s American animated television series
1980s American science fiction television series
Action figures
American children's animated action television series
American children's animated space adventure television series
American children's animated science fantasy television series
American children's animated superhero television series
Marvel Comics limited series
First-run syndicated television programs in the United States
Flash Gordon television series
Television series by Marvel Productions
The Phantom television series
Star Comics titles
1980s toys
Crossover animated television series
SAM Coupé games
Orbis Communications
Television shows based on comic strips
Television series set in 2015
Superhero teams